Soylent Green is a 1973 American ecological dystopian thriller film directed by Richard Fleischer, and starring Charlton Heston, Leigh Taylor-Young, and Edward G. Robinson in his final film role. It is loosely based on the 1966 science-fiction novel Make Room! Make Room! by Harry Harrison, with a plot that combines elements of science fiction and a police procedural. The story follows a murder investigation in a dystopian future of dying oceans and year-round humidity caused by the greenhouse effect, with the resulting pollution, depleted resources, poverty, and overpopulation. In 1973, it won the Nebula Award for Best Dramatic Presentation and the Saturn Award for Best Science Fiction Film.

Plot
By 2022, the cumulative effects of overpopulation, pollution have caused severe worldwide shortages of food, water, and housing. New York City has a population of 40 million, and only the elite can afford spacious apartments, clean water, and natural food. The homes of the elite are fortified, with security systems and bodyguards for their tenants. Usually, they include concubines (who are referred to as "furniture"). The poor live in squalor, haul water from communal spigots, and eat highly processed wafers: Soylent Red, Soylent Yellow, and the latest product, far more flavorful and nutritious, Soylent Green.

New York City Police Department detective Robert Thorn lives with his aged friend Sol Roth, a brilliant former college professor and police analyst (referred to as a "Book"). Thorn is investigating the murder of the wealthy and influential William R. Simonson, a board member of the Soylent Corporation, which he suspects was an assassination. With the help of Simonson's concubine Shirl, his investigation leads to a priest whom Simonson had visited shortly before his death. Because of the sanctity of the confessional, the visibly exhausted priest can only hint to Thorn at the contents of the confession. Soon after, the priest is murdered in the confessional by Fielding, Simonson's former bodyguard. Under direction from Governor Santini, Thorn's superiors order him to end the investigation, but he continues, fearing that he will lose his job if he files a false report. He soon becomes aware that an unknown stalker is following him. As Thorn tries to control a violent throng during a Soylent Green shortage riot, he is attacked by the assassin who killed Simonson. The killer shoots twice at Thorn, but misses, his shots striking bystanders in the crowd. Before Thorn can catch him, the killer is crushed by the hydraulic shovel of a police riot-control vehicle.

In researching the case for Thorn, Roth brings two volumes of the Soylent Oceanographic Survey Report, 2015–2019, taken by Thorn from Simonson's apartment, to the team of other "Books" (former librarians turned personal researchers) at the Supreme Exchange.. The "Books" conclude from the oceanographic reports that the oceans are dying and can no longer produce the plankton from which Soylent Green is made. This information confirms to Sol Roth that Simonson's murder was ordered by his fellow Soylent Corporation board members, who knew Simonson was increasingly troubled by the truth and feared he might disclose it to the public.

Roth is so shaken by the truth that he decides to "return to the home of God" and seeks assisted suicide at a government clinic. Thorn rushes to stop him, but arrives too late. Before dying, Roth tells his discovery to Thorn. Thorn moves to uncover proof of crimes against humanity and to bring it to the attention of the Supreme Exchange so the case can be brought to the Council of Nations to take action.

Thorn secretly boards a waste truck transporting human bodies from the euthanasia center to a waste-disposal plant, where he witnesses human corpses being processed and turned into Soylent Green. Thorn is discovered, but he escapes. As he returns to the Supreme Exchange, he is ambushed by Soylent operative Fielding and his men. Finding refuge in the church where Simonson confessed, Thorn kills his attackers, but is seriously wounded in a gun battle. As paramedics tend to Thorn, he urges Lt. Hatcher to spread the truth while shouting to the surrounding crowd, "Soylent Green is people!"

Cast

 Charlton Heston as Robert Thorn
 Leigh Taylor-Young as Shirl
 Chuck Connors as Fielding
 Brock Peters as Hatcher
 Paula Kelly as Martha
 Edward G. Robinson as Sol Roth
 Stephen Young as Gilbert
 Joseph Cotten as William R. Simonson
 Mike Henry as Kulozik
 Lincoln Kilpatrick as The Priest
 Roy Jenson as Donovan
 Leonard Stone as Charles
 Whit Bissell as Santini
 Celia Lovsky as the Exchange Leader
 Dick Van Patten as Usher #1

Production

The screenplay was based on Harry Harrison's novel Make Room! Make Room! (1966), which was set in the year 1999 with the theme of overpopulation and overuse of resources leading to increasing poverty, food shortages, and social disorder. Harrison was contractually denied control over the screenplay and was not told during negotiations that Metro-Goldwyn-Mayer was buying the film rights. He discussed the adaptation in Omni's Screen Flights/Screen Fantasies (1984), noting the "murder and chase sequences [and] the 'furniture' girls are not what the film is about and are completely irrelevant" and answered his own question, "Am I pleased with the film? I would say 50 percent".

While the book refers to "soylent steaks" (made from soy and lentil), it makes no reference to "Soylent Green", the processed food rations depicted in the film. The book's title was not used for the movie on grounds that it might have confused audiences into thinking it a big-screen version of Make Room for Daddy.

This was the 101st and final film in which Edward G. Robinson appeared; he died of bladder cancer on January 26, 1973, two months after the completion of filming. In his book The Actor's Life: Journal 1956–1976, Heston wrote, "He knew while we were shooting, though we did not, that he was terminally ill. He never missed an hour of work, nor was late to a call. He never was less than the consummate professional he had been all his life. I'm still haunted, though, by the knowledge that the very last scene he played in the picture, which he knew was the last day's acting he would ever do, was his death scene. I know why I was so overwhelmingly moved playing it with him".  Robinson had previously worked with Heston in The Ten Commandments (1956) and the make-up tests for Planet of the Apes (1968).

The film's opening sequence, depicting America becoming more crowded with a series of archive photographs set to music, was created by filmmaker Charles Braverman. The "going home" score in Roth's death scene was conducted by Gerald Fried and consists of the main themes from Symphony No. 6 ("Pathétique") by Tchaikovsky, Symphony No. 6 ("Pastoral") by Beethoven and Peer Gynt ("Morning Mood" and "Åse's Death") by Edvard Grieg. A custom cabinet unit of the early arcade game Computer Space was used in Soylent Green and is considered the first appearance of a video game in a film.

Critical response

The film was released April 19, 1973, and met with mixed reactions from critics. Time called it "intermittently interesting", noting that "Heston forsak[es] his granite stoicism for once" and asserting the film "will be most remembered for the last appearance of Edward G. Robinson.... In a rueful irony, his death scene, in which he is hygienically dispatched with the help of piped-in light classical music and movies of rich fields flashed before him on a towering screen, is the best in the film". New York Times critic A. H. Weiler wrote, "Soylent Green projects essentially simple, muscular melodrama a good deal more effectively than it does the potential of man's seemingly witless destruction of the Earth's resources"; Weiler concludes "Richard Fleischer's direction stresses action, not nuances of meaning or characterization. Mr. Robinson is pitiably natural as the realistic, sensitive oldster facing the futility of living in dying surroundings. But Mr. Heston is simply a rough cop chasing standard bad guys. Their 21st-century New York occasionally is frightening but it is rarely convincingly real".

Roger Ebert gave the film three stars out of four, calling it "a good, solid science-fiction movie, and a little more". Gene Siskel gave the film one-and-a-half stars out of four and called it "a silly detective yarn, full of juvenile Hollywood images. Wait 'til you see the giant snow shovel scoop the police use to round up rowdies. You may never stop laughing". Arthur D. Murphy of Variety wrote, "The somewhat plausible and proximate horrors in the story of 'Soylent Green' carry the Russell Thacher-Walter Seltzer production over its awkward spots to the status of a good futuristic exploitation film". Charles Champlin of the Los Angeles Times called it "a clever, rough, modestly budgeted but imaginative work". Penelope Gilliatt of The New Yorker was negative, writing, "This pompously prophetic thing of a film hasn't a brain in its beanbag. Where is democracy? Where is the popular vote? Where is women's lib? Where are the uprising poor, who would have suspected what was happening in a moment?"

On Rotten Tomatoes, the film has an approval rating of 69% rating, based on 39 reviews, with an average rating of 6.10/10. The site's consensus states: "While admittedly melodramatic and uneven in spots, Soylent Green ultimately succeeds with its dark, plausible vision of a dystopian future." A German film encyclopedia notes "If you want, you can see a thrilling crime thriller in this film. By means of brutally resonant scenes, however, the director makes clear a far deeper truth [...] Soylent Green must thus be understood as a metaphor. It is the radical image of the self-consuming madness of capitalist mode of production. The necessary consequences of the reification of 'human material' to the point of self-destruction are forcefully brought home to the viewer".

Awards and honors
 Winner Best Science Fiction Film of Year – Saturn Award, Academy of Science Fiction, Fantasy and Horror Films (Richard Fleischer, Walter Seltzer, Russell Thacher)
 Winner Grand Prize – Avoriaz International Fantastic Film Festival (Richard Fleischer)
 Nominee Best Film of Year (Best Dramatic Presentation) – Hugo Award (Richard Fleischer, Stanley Greenberg, Harry Harrison)
 Winner Best Film Script of Year (Best Dramatic Presentation) – Nebula Award, Science Fiction and Fantasy Writers of America (Stanley Greenberg, Harry Harrison)
 "Soylent Green is people!" is ranked 77th on the American Film Institute's list AFI's 100 Years...100 Movie Quotes.
 Parodied Saturday Night Live – 1973 Saturday Night Live skit added to quote’s pop culture status.

Home media
Soylent Green was released on Capacitance Electronic Disc by MGM/CBS Home Video and later on LaserDisc by MGM/UA in 1992. In November 2007, Warner Home Video released the film on DVD concurrent with the DVD releases of two other science fiction films: Logan's Run (1976), a film that covers similar themes of dystopia and overpopulation, and Outland (1981). A Blu-ray Disc release followed on March 29, 2011.

See also 
 Soylent (meal replacement), a brand of meal replacement products whose creator was inspired by the book and film
 Cloud Atlas, a 2012 film, based on David Mitchell's 2004 novel Cloud Atlas, both depicting a future society in which workers are fed with human remains
 Judge Dredd - in Mega City One, the deceased are recycled into food after they have had the funeral.
 Tender Is the Flesh, a 2020 dystopian novel by Agustina Bazterrica in which humans are farmed for their meat
 An Excess Male, a 2017 dystopian novel by Maggie Shen King that critics compared to Soylent Green due to similar speculations on human overpopulation
 Logan's Run, a 1976 dystopian movie where the population and the consumption of resources are maintained in equilibrium by killing everyone who reaches the age of 30. Those who try to escape are captured, and frozen for food.

References

Further reading

External links 

 
 
 
 
 
 Soylent Green at Internet Archive

1970s dystopian films
1970s police procedural films
1970s science fiction thriller films
1973 films
American dystopian films
American police detective films
American neo-noir films
American science fiction thriller films
Climate change films
1970s English-language films
Environmental films
Euthanasia
Fictional food and drink
Films about cannibalism
Films about famine
Films based on science fiction novels
Films directed by Richard Fleischer
Films set in 2022
Films set in New York City
Films set in the future
Metro-Goldwyn-Mayer films
Nebula Award for Best Script-winning works
Overpopulation fiction
1970s American films